Hai Golmaal In White House is a 2013 Indian comedy-drama film directed by Salar Shaikh, starring Rajpal Yadav, Govind Namdeo, Pratima Kazmi, Vijay Raaz and Yashpal Sharma.  It was released on 23 June 2013.

Plot
The movie is about people living in a white house, where the new tenants (4 gorgeous girls) looking for a house to rent and they found a house named "White House".  They find that the other people residing are of unique characters, living their lives hard and boring.

Cast
Rajpal Yadav
Govind Namdev
Pratima Kazmi
Vijay Raaz 
Yashpal Sharma

Soundtrack
All songs were composed by Shamir Tandon.

"Baithe Baithe Dil Ko" - Kailash Kher
"Dil Lagane Ko Jab Dil" - Asha Bhosle
"Door Jao Na Tum" - Kunal Ganjawala
"Ek Ladki Se Aaj Main" - N/A
"Ek To Pyaar Ki Umar Hai" - N/A

References

Indian comedy-drama films
2010s Hindi-language films
Films scored by Shamir Tandon
2013 comedy-drama films
2013 films